Williams is an unincorporated community in Root Township, Adams County, in the U.S. state of Indiana.

History
Williams was originally named Greenville in the 1870s (after the brothers who ran the sawmill), but this was changed as there was already a post office bearing the name of Greenville, Indiana. Garrett Williams therefore proposed the current name .

Geography

References

Unincorporated communities in Adams County, Indiana
Unincorporated communities in Indiana